DJ Aqeel (born Aqeel Ali) is an Indian DJ and composer.

Biography

Family
Aqeel married Farah Khan Ali, who is the daughter of actor Sanjay Khan, and is the sister of the Bollywood actor Zayed Khan, in 1999. The couple have two children.

Nightclubs owned
He used to own the Hype Nightclub in Atria Mall in Worli, Mumbai, also in Delhi's Hotel Shangri-La and in Ludhiana known as Urban Hara (Hype).

Discography

Singles and collaborations
 Shake It Daddy Mix77
 Tu Haiwahin
 'Fanaa for you' in the movie Fanaa
 'My Dil Goes Mmmm (English Club Mix)' and 'My Dil Goes Mmmm (Instrumental)' in the movie Salaam Namaste
 Gal Ban Gayi Remix T-Series
 Ek Do Teen (remix) for movie : Desi Magic
 "Ye Waada Raha (remix)"
 "Nihaal Ho Gayi (remix)"
 "Aap Se Mausiiquii (Tropical Mix)" for Album Aap Se Mausiiquii
 "Dil Disco Karein (Remix)" for Album Surroor 2021

Albums
 Aur Ek Haseena Thi (T-Series)
 The Daddy Mix (UMI-10)
 The return to the Daddy Mix (UMI-10)
 Ek Hasina Thi (UMI-10)
 DJ Aqeel Forever (Saregama)
 Don Remix (UMI-10)
 DJ Aqeel Forever 2 (2012) (Saregama)
 DJ Aqeel Forever 3 (2014) (Saregama)
 DJ Aqeel Disco 82

References

External links
 

Indian male playback singers
Singers from Hyderabad, India
Indian male pop singers
Indian male singer-songwriters
Indian singer-songwriters
Living people
Indian DJs
Place of birth missing (living people)
Indian musicians
Year of birth missing (living people)